Damber Sing Sambahamphe is a Nepalese politician, belonging to the Communist Party of Nepal (UML). In the 2008 Constituent Assembly election he was elected from the Panchthar-2 constituency, winning   	12402 votes.

References

Living people
Communist Party of Nepal (Unified Marxist–Leninist) politicians
People from Panchthar District
Year of birth missing (living people)
Nepal MPs 1991–1994
Nepal MPs 1999–2002
Members of the 1st Nepalese Constituent Assembly